Vanco may refer to:

People
 Marcel Vanco (fr, de, it), French football player
 Marek Vančo (born 1989), Czech handball player
 Mark Vanco (born 1968), American designer and artist
 Vančo Micevski, Macedonian football player
 Vančo Stojanov (born 1977), Macedonian middle-distance runner
 Vančo Trajanov (born 1978), Macedonian football player
 Vančo Trajčev (born 1975), Macedonian football player
 Vančo Šontevski, Macedonian officer

Other
 vancomycin, an antibiotic
 Vanco, a subsidiary of Global Cloud Xchange